Huvra  is a village and town in Mauritania.

Communes of Mauritania